Green Ridge may refer to:

Green Ridge, Arkansas
Green Ridge, Missouri
Green Ridge, West Virginia
Green Ridge, a district of Scranton, Pennsylvania

See also
Greenridge, Staten Island